When Genius Failed: The Rise and Fall of Long-Term Capital Management is a book by Roger Lowenstein published by Random House on October 9, 2000.  The book puts on an unauthorized account of the creation, early success, abrupt collapse, and rushed bailout of Long-Term Capital Management (LTCM).  LTCM was a tightly-held American hedge fund founded in 1993 which commanded more than $100 billion in assets at its height, then collapsed abruptly in August/September 1998.  Prompted by deep concerns about LTCM's thousands of derivative contracts, in order to avoid a panic by banks and investors worldwide, the Federal Reserve Bank of New York stepped in to organize a bailout with the various major banks at risk.

The book's account is largely based on interviews conducted with former employees of LTCM, the six primary banks involved in the rescue, and the Federal Reserve, as well as informal interactions by phone and e-mail with Eric Rosenfeld, one of LTCM's founding partners.  As of 2014, there have been four editions in English, five editions in Japanese, one edition in Russian and one edition in Chinese.

The book received numerous accolades, including being chosen by BusinessWeek among the best business books of 2000.

Overview
The book tells the story of Long-Term Capital Management (LTCM), an American hedge fund which commanded more than $100 billion in assets at its height. Among LTCM's principals were several former university professors, including two Nobel Prize-winning economists. The book is separated into two sections: the rise and the fall. Chapters 1-6 correspond to the first section and chapters 7-10 the second. The topics include:

Chapter 1: Meriwether
Chapter 2: Hedge Fund
Chapter 3: On the Run
Chapter 4: Dear Investors
Chapter 5: Tug-of-War
Chapter 6: A Nobel Prize
Chapter 7: Bank of Volatility
Chapter 8: The Fall
Chapter 9: The Human Factor
Chapter 10: At the Fed

Between 1994 and 1998, the fund showed a return on investment of more than 40% per annum. However, its enormously leveraged gamble with various forms of arbitrage involving more than $1 trillion went bad, and in one month, LTCM lost $1.9 billion. On the precipice of not only an American financial disaster, the fund's imminent collapse had significant international monetary implications, jeopardizing the financial system itself. Prompted by deep concerns about LTCM's thousands of derivative contracts, in order to avoid a panic by banks and investors worldwide, the Federal Reserve Bank of New York stepped in to organize a bailout with the various major banks at risk.

Major characters
John Meriwether — head of the LTCM arbitrageurs.
Larry Hilibrand
Eric Rosenfeld
Robert C. Merton
Myron Scholes
Victor Haghani
Jon Corzine — former CEO of Goldman Sachs

References

External links
 Book Review: When Genius Failed, by Roger Lowenstein
 Review on Bookfinder.com

2000 non-fiction books
Long-Term Capital Management
Books about traders
Books about companies
Random House books